Hector Florentino Roca (born 2 November 1972) is an equestrian from Dominican Republic.

Career
He won gold at the 2018 Central American and Caribbean Games in Barranquilla, Colombia. In 2011, 2015, and 2020, the Dominican Equestrian Sports Federation named him the International Jumping Rider of the Year. He was selected to compete for Dominican Republic at the 2020 Summer Olympics in the show jumping.

In January 2022, riding ABC Quantum Cruise Florentino won the opening first Challenge Cup at the Winter Equestrian  Festival held at the Palm Beach International Equestrian Centre in Florida.
In May 2022, Florentino won the $75,000 Bear’s Smokehouse BBQ Grand Prix CSI 2* event in Mill Spring, North Carolina riding ABC Quantum Cruise. Florentino had two rides in the 7 horse jump off. Rising Ultimo, Florentino won the $35,000 Welcome Cup at the Kentucky Horse Show held in Lexington in May 2022.

References

Living people
1972 births
Dominican Republic equestrians
Olympic equestrians of the Dominican Republic
Equestrians at the 2020 Summer Olympics
Equestrians at the 2003 Pan American Games
Equestrians at the 2011 Pan American Games
Equestrians at the 2015 Pan American Games
Equestrians at the 2019 Pan American Games
Central American and Caribbean Games gold medalists for the Dominican Republic
Central American and Caribbean Games bronze medalists for the Dominican Republic
Competitors at the 2010 Central American and Caribbean Games
Competitors at the 2014 Central American and Caribbean Games
Competitors at the 2018 Central American and Caribbean Games